Sich-1 is the first Ukrainian Earth observation satellite and was launched on 31 August 1995 at 06:49:59 UTC by Ukrainian Tsyklon-3 rocket from Plesetsk Cosmodrome in Russia.

See also

 1995 in spaceflight

References

External links
 Sich-1 on nkau.gov.ua
 Okean-O1 Series // eoPortal Directory
 Herbert J. Kramer ”Observation of the Earth and Its Environment: Survey of Missions and Sensors", 4th edition 2002, pp. 1514 // Springer Verlag 
 Okean-O1 1, 2, 3, 4, 5, 6, 7 // Gunter's space page
 Ukrainian Sich-1 Spacecraft Model

1995 in Ukraine
Earth observation satellites
First artificial satellites of a country
Satellites of Ukraine
Spacecraft launched in 1995
Yuzhmash satellites and probes
State Space Agency of Ukraine